Rosenholm Castle is Denmark's oldest family-owned castle. It is one of the best-preserved complexes from the golden age of the manor house –  from 1550 to 1630.

History
The manor Holm is known from the 14th century. It was owned by the Catholic Church, but at the Reformation in 1536 it came in possession of The Crown. King Frederick II exchanged it for some other estates owned by  Danish nobleman and diplomat Jørgen Ottesen Rosenkrantz (1523-1596). The Rosenkrantz family is among the oldest and most famous in Danish history. Shakespeare chose to use the surname in the play ''Hamlet.

Jørgen Rosenkrantz had two sons: Otto Rosenkrantz (1560-1582) and Holger Rosenkrantz (1574-1642). He built a manor for both of them: Skaføgård for Otto  and Rosenholm for Holger. Unfortunately Otto died early, after which Skaføgård became a dower house for Jørgen's wife, Dorthe Lange (1541-1613) and after her death passed to their surviving son Holger. 

Rosenholm Castle was founded in 1559. Jørgen Rosenkrantz build three wings, while the fourth and last was first added by his son Holger Ottesen Rosenkrantz  (1517-1575). Its architecture was very much different from other castles in Denmark. It was mostly inspired from Italy. On the main facade there was an open loggia. It was later extended, standing complete in 1607 with four wings, clearly influenced by the Italian Renaissance style. The castle interior was modernised in the 1740s in the Baroque style, at which time a large baroque garden was laid out, covering an area of 5 ha., with avenues of limetrees and hedgerows of beech.

Sights & attractions
Manor house milieu over 450 years
Anthroposophic paintings by the painter Arild Rosenkrantz.
Baroque park with symmetrical avenues.
Pirkentavl gazebo from  around 1560.

See also 
 List of castles and palaces in Denmark
 Rosenkrantz (noble family)
 Skaføgård

References

External links
Rosenholm Slot website

Castles in Denmark
Listed buildings and structures in Syddjurs Municipality
Houses completed in 1607
Castles in the Central Denmark Region
Hornslet
Tourist attractions in Denmark
Tourist attractions in the Central Denmark Region
Buildings and structures in Denmark associated with the Rosenkrantz family